The 2017 season of competitive association football in Indonesia.

Promotion and relegation

Pre-season 
No teams are promoted or relegated as of all of 2015 football competitions in Indonesia abandoned due to a ban by Imam Nahrawi, Minister of Youth and Sports Affairs, against PSSI to run any football competition and in 2016 no official competition was held because FIFA froze the membership of the PSSI, resulting in the suspension of the Indonesian Football Association.

National team

Indonesia national football team

Friendlies

 1 Not an international FIFA match "A".

2017 Aceh World Solidarity Tsunami Cup

Indonesia national under-23 football team

2018 AFC U-23 Championship qualification

2017 Southeast Asian Games

Friendlies

Indonesia national under-19 football team

2018 AFC U-19 Championship qualification

2017 AFF U-18 Youth Championship

2017 Toulon Tournament

Friendlies

League season

Liga 1

Liga 2 

Knockout Round

Final

Liga 3 

Knockout Round

Final

Indonesian clubs in Asia

AFC Champions League 
Indonesia did not submit any club entry.

AFC Cup 
Indonesia did not submit any club entry.

References